Tora Berger (born 18 March 1981) is a retired Norwegian biathlete and Olympic champion.

Personal life

Berger married in 2010, having met her husband in high school.  They have two dogs Tussi (Eeyore in English) and Tarzan – Tarzan often joins her on training runs.  Whilst away from home during the biathlon season she enjoys knitting and reading (especially books about crime).  Outside biathlon she enjoys hunting and fishing.

Career
She has been a member of the Norwegian women's biathlon team since 1999. She has 28 individual victories in the World Cup.

At the 2008 World Championship, she received three 4th places, before earning the silver medal in the mass start.

On 18 February 2010, she became the first Norwegian woman to win an Olympic gold medal in biathlon by winning the women's 15 km individual at the 2010 Winter Olympics in Vancouver. By doing this, she won Norway's 100th Olympic gold medal at the Winter Olympic Games, as well as winning the 10th Norwegian biathlon gold medal. This historic medal makes Norway the first ever nation to win 100 gold medals at the Winter Olympic Games.

At the Biathlon World Championships 2013 in Nove Mesto, she won gold in the mixed relay, silver in the sprint and gold in the pursuit before becoming the first woman to defend her 15k individual title. She followed this up with a stunning final-leg performance in the relay, making up a deficit of nearly 40 seconds on the leaders to take another gold medal, before taking silver in the mass start. As the holder of 18 world championship medals she is second in the table of total medals, one medal behind Uschi Disl.  At the same championships, she also became the first biathlete (male or female) to win 6 medals at a single biathlon world championships, with four golds and two silvers.

Berger competed in Biathlon at the 2014 Winter Olympics in Sochi where she won 3 medals. Gold in the  Mixed relay together with Tiril Eckhoff, Ole Einar Bjørndalen and Emil Hegle Svendsen, a silver in the Women's Pursuit, and a silver in the Women's relay,

IBU World Cup
Although Tora Berger had been part of the Norwegian women's biathlon team since 1999, up until the end of the 2011–12 season she had never been the world cup winner either overall or in any of the individual disciplines. Her highest finish was third in the overall standings in the 2008–09 and 2011–12 seasons, second in the Pursuit discipline in the 2008–09 season, and second in the Mass Start discipline in the 2011–12 season.

Success came in the 2012–13 World Cup season, with Tora taking 11 wins and missing the podium only seven times. Her 19 podium finishes equalled Magdalena Forsberg's record for the highest number of podium finishes in a single season. She won all three races at Oslo Holmenkollen to secure the crystal globes for both the Overall women's world cup and the Pursuit discipline.  By the end of the season she had also won the crystal globe for the Individual, Sprint and Mass Start disciplines, completing a clean sweep of the five women's crystal globes (a feat last achieved by Magdalena Forsberg in the 2001–02 season).  With Berger's contribution, Norway also won the 2012/13 season's Women's Nation Cup, Women's Relay Cup and Mixed Relay Cup.

*Key:Races—number of entered races/all races; Points—World Cup points; Position—World Cup season ranking.

Biathlon results

Olympic Games

World Championships
 18 medals – (8 gold, 5 silver, 5 bronze)

Junior/Youth World Championships

Individual victories
28 victories (7 Sp, 9 Pu, 5 In, 7 MS) 

*Results are from IBU races which include the Biathlon World Cup, Biathlon World Championships and the Winter Olympic Games.

Cross-country skiing results
All results are sourced from the International Ski Federation (FIS).

World Cup

Season standings

Team podiums
 1 podium – (1 )

Awards and nominations
 2013: Awarded the Holmenkollen medal
 2013: Winner of Norwegian Sportsperson of the Year 2012
 2013: Winner of the "Female athlete of the year" for 2012 at the Sports Gala 2013
 2013: Nominated for the "Name of the year" for 2012 at the Sports Gala 2013
 2012: Nominated for the "Female athlete of the year" for 2011 at the Sports Gala 2012
 2011: Nominated for "Name of the year" for 2010 at the Sports Gala 2011
 2011: Nominated for "Female athlete of the year" for 2010 at the Sports Gala 2011
 2010: Nominated for "Female athlete of the year" for 2009 at the Sports Gala 2010

References

External links

 
 
 
 

1981 births
Living people
People from Lesja
Norwegian female biathletes
Norwegian female cross-country skiers
Olympic biathletes of Norway
Biathletes at the 2006 Winter Olympics
Biathletes at the 2010 Winter Olympics
Biathletes at the 2014 Winter Olympics
Olympic gold medalists for Norway
Olympic silver medalists for Norway
Olympic bronze medalists for Norway
Olympic medalists in biathlon
Biathlon World Championships medalists
Holmenkollen medalists
Medalists at the 2010 Winter Olympics
Medalists at the 2014 Winter Olympics
Sportspeople from Innlandet
21st-century Norwegian women